Fabrizio Casazza (born 16 September 1970) is an Italian former footballer who played as a goalkeeper.

Playing career
Casazza started his career at Sampdoria, but spent his career at Serie C1 for Fidelis Andria and Pro Sesto.

He transferred to Verona in 1994, started his first Serie B season.
He then played for Torino (Serie B) and Venezia (Serie A) before rejoin U.C. Sampdoria in 2000, to play second goalkeeper role, behind Matteo Sereni (2000–01), Luca Mondini (2001–02) and Luigi Turci (2002–03).

He was signed by S.S. Lazio in 2003, and played for 2 years, as Angelo Peruzzi and Sereni backup. He played his only match at UEFA Cup on 4 November 2004.

He then joined Serie C1 team Pavia.

On 17 January 2007, A.C. Milan signed Marco Storari from Messina, and Messina signed Gabriele Paoletti on 19 January from Udinese to replace the 1st choice place.

To provide extra cover for Morgan De Sanctis, Casazza was signed for Udinese on 24 January.

Coaching career

After retiring as a goalkeeper, Casazza took management duties at Genoa amateurs Bolzanetese in 2008–09. From July 2009 he is goalkeeper coach at Virtus Entella.

References

External links
 SSLazio.it
 Profile at calciatori.com
 Profile at tuttocalciatori.com

1970 births
Living people
S.S. Fidelis Andria 1928 players
U.C. Sampdoria players
Hellas Verona F.C. players
Torino F.C. players
Venezia F.C. players
S.S. Lazio players
F.C. Pavia players
S.S.D. Pro Sesto players
Udinese Calcio players
Serie A players
Serie B players
Association football goalkeepers
Footballers from Genoa
Italian footballers
A.S.D. La Biellese players